A by-election was held for the New South Wales Legislative Assembly electorate of East Macquarie on 11 July 1882 because Alfred Pechey, who was elected at the January by-election, had died four months later without taking his seat.

Dates

Result

Alfred Pechey died.

See also
Electoral results for the district of East Macquarie
List of New South Wales state by-elections

References

1882 elections in Australia
New South Wales state by-elections
1880s in New South Wales